John Haslett may refer to:

 John Haslet (c. 1727 – 1777), American Presbyterian minister and soldier
 John F. Haslett, American writer